Hersekli, meaning "of Herzegovina" or "Herzegovinian" in Turkish, relating to the Ottoman Sanjak of Herzegovina, was an epithet used for Ottoman nobility. It may refer to:

Hersekzade Ahmed Pasha–Hersekli Ahmed Paşa (1459–1517), Ottoman Grand Vizier
Telli Hasan Pasha–Hersekli Hasan Paşa (1530–1593), Ottoman governor and general
Osman Pasha the Bosnian–Hersekli Osman Paşa (fl. 1676–85), Ottoman governor

Turkish words and phrases
Herzegovina